Margaret Long (born July 26, 1938) is an American politician who is a former Democratic member of the Kansas House of Representatives, representing the 36th district. She began her service via an appointment on February 2, 1998.

Long is a retired administrative accountant.

Committee membership
 Transportation (Ranking Member)
 Energy and Utilities
 Financial Institutions
 Insurance
 Joint Committee on Pensions, Investments and Benefits
 Select Committee on KPERS

Major donors
The top 5 donors to Long's 2008 campaign:
1. AT&T 	$750
2. Kansas Contractors Assoc 	$600
3. Chesapeake Energy 	$500
4. Carpenters District Council of Kansas City 	$500 	
5. Kansas Optometric Association 	$500

References

External links
Kansas Legislature - Margaret Long
Project Vote Smart profile
Kansas Votes profile
State Surge - Legislative and voting track record
Follow the Money campaign contributions:
1998,2000, 2006, 2008

Democratic Party members of the Kansas House of Representatives
Living people
Women state legislators in Kansas
1938 births
20th-century American women politicians
20th-century American politicians
21st-century American women politicians
21st-century American politicians